The madal or maadal is a Nepalese folk musical instrument. The madal is used mainly for rhythm-keeping in Nepalese folk music. It is very popular and widely used as a hand drum in Nepal. The madal has a cylindrical body with a slight bulge at its center and heads at both ends, one head larger than the other. It is usually played horizontally in a seated position, with both heads played simultaneously.

The madal is the national instrument of Nepal and is the backbone of most Nepali folk music. The well-known Nepali musician Ranjit Gazmer introduced this instrument to Bollywood music when he started working under Rahul Dev Burman, and has used it in numerous Bollywood songs such as Hum Dono Do Premi and Kanchi Re Kanchi Re. There is also a madal drum used by certain Adivasi groups.

History and nomenclature 
The madal originated in the Magar community of  Nepal.

The name of the madal is said to come from that of an earlier instrument, the mardal, whose name in turn is derived from the mridung, a classical Indian instrument. In the Palpa district of Nepal, it is known as rāni mādal. In the Nepalbhasa (Newar) language in the Kathmandu Valley, it's called the maga khĩ in reference to the Magar people.

Construction 
Typically, a wooden log is carved so as to form a hollow cavity, called ghar. The heads of the drum are made of double-layered goat skins, and a black paste made of flour, iron filings, and egg is burned in to a circular area in the center of each head. This circle adds weight to the head and significantly alters the sound of the drum, giving it a bell-like quality. The heads are fixed to the body of the drum by leather strips running the length of the body, and an additional loose strip of leather which can be looped behind the performer's knees while playing The larger and smaller heads are often referred to as male and female respectively.

Similarities 

Similar instruments called modal or mondal are found throughout the Central India and Bangladesh.

See also
Maddalam
Dholak
Damphu drum

References

Notes
 Anmol, Amrita Priyamvada (2009). Encyclopaedia of Indian Musical Instruments, vols. 1 to 3 :, xxxvi, 720 p, 3 vols, figs, 
 L.S. Rajagopalan, L.S. in A. Purushothaman and A. Harindranath (eds) (2010). Temple Musical Instruments of Kerala. Sangeet Natak Akademi, xvi, 168 p,

External links
 Madal Folk Instrument of Nepal
Nepal Magazine article, origins of madal and its various names.

Membranophones
Drums of Nepal